Banca Finnat is a company that provides investment services to institutional, private and corporate customers; it is listed on the Italian Stock Exchange. The Bank's origins date back to 1898, when the company was founded by the Nattino family, initially as a finance company. Banca Finnat then became a brokerage company, a real estate brokerage company and lastly, since 12 February 1998, an intermediary bank. Banca Finnat is today listed in the STAR section of the Borsa Italiana-London Stock Exchange.

Organization

The key operating areas of Banca Finnat are asset management and financial consulting for private and corporate clients, besides real estate management services through the subsidiary InvestiRE SGR S.p.A. InvestiRE SGR S.p.A., a real estate fund manager, Banca Finnat manages 7 billion assets diversified on various products and markets.

Some history

The origins and history of Banca Finnat date back to 1898, when Pietro Nattino opened a financial business, which has been developed by the successive generations of the family to the present day. In 1961, Euramerica Finanziaria Internazionale was established following a partnership with Morgan Group. In 1991, after the enactment of the new Italian law on stockbroking companies, both Finnat and Euramerica were registered as Società di intermediazione mobiliare or SIMs. In 1998, the company became a bank, specialising in investment services for institutional clients, businesses and individuals.

Today, Banca Finnat is listed in the STAR segment of the Italian Stock Exchange-London Stock Exchange and offers investment services.

In February 2017 Giampietro Nattino left the office of president. In March 2018 Banca Finnat decided to exit the London Stock Exchange, of which it had been a shareholder since 2007 following the merger of the London Stock Exchange with Borsa Spa: it was the last Italian banking partner. In 2018 Flavia Mazzarella was appointed president, until 2021 when she was replaced by the new president: Marco Tofanelli. After trying to acquire Cesare Ponti bank to grow in northern Italy, it updated the Business Plan until 2024 aiming to grow the subsidiary InvestiRE Sgr Spa, the real estate asset management company of the Group.

Headquarters and major offices

Palazzo Altieri, the headquarters of Banca Finnat, was designed halfway through the 17th century by the architect Antonio De' Rossi, and subsequently decorated by several artists on the request of Pope Clement X. At the end of the 18th century the building became an important monument to the Roman and International Neoclassicism. It is still regarded today as a fine example of the Baroque architectural and artistic style. In the entrance hall of the Bank the frescoed ceiling portrays the "Apotheosis of Romulus", a piece by Domenico Maria Canuti.

The Group also has offices in  Rome, Milan, Novi Ligure and Lugano

Group subsidiaries

Finnat Fiduciaria S.p.A.
Finnat Gestioni S.A.
Natam S.A.
InvestiRE Immobiliare SGR S.p.A.

Associates
Imprebanca S.p.A.

References

External links
http://www.bancafinnat.it/en/
https://web.archive.org/web/20131201060730/http://www.bancafinnat.it/en/pages/index/1/2/0/0/Investor-Relations

Banks of Italy